San Rocco Redoubt was a redoubt in Kalkara, Malta. It was built by Great Britain during the French blockade of 1798-1800. It was part of a chain of batteries, redoubts and entrenchments encircling the French positions in Marsamxett and the Grand Harbour.

The redoubt was built roughly halfway between Fort Ricasoli (then occupied by French forces) and Santa Maria delle Grazie Tower. It was located close to San Rocco Battery, a Maltese insurgent battery which had men from the 30th (Cambridgeshire) Regiment of Foot in its garrison. The redoubt was built around a small building and a chapel dedicated to Saint Roch, from which it got its name.

The redoubt was built by the British in order to provide cover for retreating British forces in the case of the arrival of a French relief force to break the siege of Malta. Upon the arrival of a relief force, the 30th and 89th Regiments of Foot were to gather at San Rocco Battery, and under the cover of San Rocco Redoubt, they were to retreat to Żabbar. From there, they would retreat to Żejtun, and then to Fort Rohan under the cover of San Lucian redoubt. They would embark on their ships in Marsaxlokk Harbour and evacuate the island.

San Rocco Redoubt, as well as the chapel and building it was built around, have been demolished. The area is now occupied by SmartCity.

References

Redoubts in Malta
Kalkara
Military installations established in 1799
Demolished buildings and structures in Malta
French occupation of Malta
Vernacular architecture in Malta
British fortifications in Malta
Limestone buildings in Malta
1799 establishments in Malta
18th-century fortifications
18th Century military history of Malta